Starfire III: Empires is a 1981 board game published by Task Force Games.

Gameplay
Starfire III: Empires is a game that expands and incorporates the tactical game of Starfire into a grand strategic game of exploration and conquest.

Reception
William A. Barton reviewed Starfire III: Empires in The Space Gamer No. 47. Barton commented that "Overall, Starfire III: Empires does a good job of what it sets out to do – complicating and extending the Starfire system into a campaign game. If such appeals to be, and you already own Starfire and perhaps Starfire II, you should find it worth the buy."

Steve List reviewed Starfire III: Empires in Ares Magazine #13 and commented that "Given an abstract combat resolution system, it could be a decent postal game played with a referee. All in all, it should be of interest mainly to fans of the existing Starfire games."

References

Board games introduced in 1981
Task Force Games games